Castilla-La Mancha Fútbol Sala was a futsal club based in Talavera de la Reina, Castile-La Mancha. Castilla-La Mancha was one of the most important futsal clubs from Spain.

The club was founded in 1984 and its stadium was the ground 1º de Mayo with capacity of 3,000 seats.

The club was sponsored by Caja Toledo from 1990–91 until 1991–92 and by Caja Castilla-La Mancha, from 1992–93 until 1994–95. During season 1995–96 the team was known as Toledart.

History
The club was founded in 1984. The club reached the División de Honor in 1989–90 season. From 1990–91 season until 1999–00 season the club played in División de Honor continuously. At end of season 1999–00, the owner of club, very disappointed with the mayor of Talavera de la Reina, sold his seat to Azkar Lugo FS.

Season to season

10 seasons in División de Honor
1 season in 1ª Nacional A

Trophies
División de Honor: 2
Winners: 1991–92 and 1996–97
Copa de España: 1
Winners: 1990–91
Supercopa de España: 1
Winners: 1996–97
Iberian Futsal Cup: 1
Winners: 1992–93

References

External links
Profile on LNFS.es
Former unofficial website

Futsal clubs in Spain
Sports teams in Castilla–La Mancha
Futsal clubs established in 1984
Sports clubs disestablished in 2000
1984 establishments in Spain
2000 disestablishments in Spain
Sport in Talavera de la Reina